Synaphe infumatalis is a species of moth of the family Pyralidae. It was described by Nikolay Grigoryevich Erschoff in 1874. It is found in Kazakhstan.

References

Moths described in 1874
Pyralini